Ostrovica is a village in Serbia located southeast of Niš, on the railroad toward Dimitrovgrad, in the municipality of Niška Banja. According to the 2002 census, the village had 603 inhabitants.

References
 Popis stanovništva, domaćinstava i Stanova 2002. Knjiga 1: Nacionalna ili etnička pripadnost po naseljima. Republika Srbija, Republički zavod za statistiku Beograd 2003.

See also
List of settlements in Serbia

Populated places in Nišava District